The Danish Ministry of Climate, Energy and Utilities is a governmental agency in Denmark. It is responsible for national climate policy and international cooperation on climate change, as well as energy issues, meteorology and national geological surveys in Denmark and Greenland.

History
The predecessor of the Ministry of Climate and Energy, the Ministry of Energy, was created in 1979, from the energy department of the Ministry of Trade. In 1994, it was merged with Ministry of the Environment and in 2005 it was detached from that ministry, to be merged with Ministry of Transport and Energy.

On 23 November 2007, the energy issues were de-merged from the Ministry of Transport and climate issues were de-merged from the Ministry of Environment and the Ministry of Climate and Energy was created.

List of ministers

Agencies
A number of agencys belong to the ministry:

 Danmarks Meteorologiske Institut (DMI)
 Forsyningstilsynet (reseacrh board)
 Energinet
 Klimarådet (climate council)
 Styrelsen for Dataforsyning og Effektivisering
 De Nationale Geologiske Undersøgelser for Danmark og Grønland (GEUS)
 Energistyrelsen (Danish Energy Agency)
 Geodatastyrelsen

The Danish Electricity Saving Trust (Elsparefonden) is an independent trust under the auspices of the Danish Ministry of Climate and Energy. The Trust works to promote energy savings and a more efficient use of electricity.

See also
 Electricity sector in Denmark

References

External links
Archived official website in English. The website of the current Danish Energy Agency is at http://ens.dk/en

Ministry of Energy
Denmark
Energy
Ministries established in 1979
 
Geology of Denmark
Climate change ministries
Climate